Ananta Kandali (1540–1580) was Brahmin poet from Hajo, Kamrup district. Ananta Kandali's real name was Haricharan, but he is popularly known by his scholastic title "Ananta Kandali". His father, Ratna Pathak, was a renowned scholar and expounder of the Bhagavata at the Madhava temple.

As a prolific writer, Kandali gained many literary distinctions, and acquired titles like "Ananta Kandali". He became a disciple of Sankardev and attracted towards Vaisnava cult.

See also

 Bhattadeva
 Hema Saraswati

References

Kamrupi poets
1540 births
1580 deaths
16th-century Indian poets
Indian male poets
Assamese people